The Punisher: The End is a one-shot title published by Marvel Comics under the MAX imprint as part of their The End series. The story focuses on the Punisher's final days in a post-apocalyptic future. The date of the events is described on the opening page of the comic in one word "soon."

Plot
The comic begins after World War III, which began in Iraq, North Korea, and Pakistan, and spread to China. It climaxes to a full-scale global nuclear holocaust. Frank Castle (who years before was apprehended and incarcerated in Sing-Sing Prison) survives by taking refuge in a fallout shelter hidden in the prison's high-security block, with a handful of other prisoners and prison officers. A year after the bombs fall, Frank leaves the prison and begins his journey to New York City, taking with him Paris Peters, a con artist who expresses interest in Frank's mission to find another bomb shelter hidden deep beneath the former site of the World Trade Center.

Frank and Paris travel across upstate New York, past the ruined remains of civilization, ignoring the radiation they know will kill them. They locate the Manhattan bomb shelter and gain access, where they fall unconscious. Both awaken in the infirmary, where the doctors reveal they will die within hours of radiation poisoning. Frank murders the doctor and the guards, taking their weapons and shooting his way through the shelter's security forces, arriving in a board room filled with the Coven. The coven are a group of generals, senators, oil magnates, and computer billionaires. Frank, having learned about the Coven from a prisoner at Sing-Sing who designed their shelter, blames them for escalating the War on Terror in the name of profit and the resulting global holocaust.

As Frank is about to execute the Coven, they beg for mercy, revealing that other members, hidden in bases across the world, have self-destructed due to outbreaks of insanity. They reveal that they are the last people left on Earth, the last hope for humanity, but with the resources they control in the shelter, they can repopulate the world. But knowing that these people would doom the world again, Frank kills them all. When Paris asked why he doomed humanity, Castle says: "The human race. You've seen what that leads to". Frank then states that no mere con-artist would be in the high-security block, and Paris confesses that his crime, while planned as simple insurance fraud, also set fire to a kindergarten, killing several dozen children. Frank thus strangles him.

Frank re-emerges into the irradiated Manhattan wasteland, hair falling out in clumps, fire burning his flesh as he starts walking to New York City's Central Park. In his mind, it is 1976, and he is going to try to go back in time to save his family from their fate.

References

2004 comics debuts
End
The End (comics) titles
Marvel Comics one-shots
Comics by Garth Ennis
Comics set in New York City
Post-apocalyptic comics